Delfin Campo (born 27 October 1966) is a Spanish former alpine skier who competed in the 1988 Winter Olympics.

References

1966 births
Living people
Spanish male alpine skiers
Olympic alpine skiers of Spain
Alpine skiers at the 1988 Winter Olympics
20th-century Spanish people